Knitta Please, also known as simply Knitta, is the group of artists who began the "knit graffiti" movement in Houston, Texas in 2005. They are known for wrapping public architecture—e.g. lampposts, parking meters, telephone poles, and signage—with knitted or crocheted material, a process known as "knit graffiti", "yarn storming" or "yarnbombing".
The mission is to make street art "a little more warm and fuzzy."

Knitta grew to eleven members by the end of 2007, but eventually dwindled down to its founder, Magda Sayeg, who continues to travel and knit graffiti. Internationally, as many as a dozen groups have followed Knitta's lead. Sayeg and the group have shown their art across the United States and around the world.

History
The group began with a self-taught knitter known as PolyCotN. She founded the group with anonymous member AKrylik in October 2005 as a way to deal with frustration over their own unfinished knitting projects. It started with a doorknob cosy for the front door of Sayeg's Houston boutique. She loved it and, unexpectedly, so did the passersby. That inspired them to make more.

The name of the group and the nicknames of the members were inspired by a desire to "resemble graffiti, but with knitted items". The group mixed crafting terminology with a hip-hop style, then changed the spelling "to represent traditional street art monikers". PolyCotN and AKrylik came up with their own names, then invented names for other members. Some former member names include Knotorious N.I.T., SonOfaStitch and P-Knitty.

By 2007, Knitta's membership had grown twelve members and there were an estimated five to twelve copycat groups internationally. By 2009, there was a groundswell, according to Sydney, Australia author and academic Emily Howes, who identified groups in Scandinavia, Japan, South Africa, and the United States.
However, membership in Knitta eventually dwindled, leaving only the founder.

Art
Usually tagging on Friday nights and Sunday mornings, Knitta taggers would leave a paper tag on each work, bearing the slogan "knitta please" or "whaddup knitta?". They tagged trees, lamp posts, railings, fire hydrants, monuments and other urban targets, 
Another popular piece involved hanging knitted-bagged sneakers over aerial telephone cable. The crew would mark holidays by doing themed work, using, for example, pink yarn for Valentine's Day pieces and sparkly yarn for New Years. When Knitta was not working with a theme, they would work on projects, tagging specific targets or specific areas. 
The group and their followers consider their graffiti "a method of beautifying public space". However, such work is considered vandalism in some U.S. States.

In 2006 the group decided to visit New York City, where they did their first large scale piece. Knitta also called on others across the U.S. to get tagging and send in their images.

For another large project, the group tagged all 25 trees in the median of Allen Parkway in Houston for the annual Art Car parade in May 2006, wrapping them in blankets measuring two feet tall by two and a half feet long. A year later, they were invited to the Standard Hotel in Los Angeles, which caters to an edgy clientele, to tag a glass box featuring trendsetters' designs and concepts.

To celebrate the 60th anniversary of Bergère de France, the first manufacturer of French yarn, the company invited Knitta to Paris to "revitalize urban landscapes with knitted pieces". While there, they also tagged the Notre Dame de Paris. Knitta's work has also been seen in London, Sydney, Rome, Milan, Prague, Sweden, Montreal, Mexico City, El Salvador, Netherlands, Germany, Luxembourg and atop the Great Wall of China.

References

External links
 Knitta photo gallery
 Knitta blog

Knitting
Knitting organizations
Public art in the United States
Graffiti and unauthorised signage